The Fast Sword is a 1971 Hong Kong action film directed by Huang Feng. The film stars Chang Yi and Wong Chung Shun.

The film was shown in France and Germany.

Plot
Chang Yi and his sister, Hon Seung Kam, live on their farm with their blind mother Wang Li. Their father was murdered by Wong Tung Shung. Seeking revenge when he learns his father's killer has returned, he finds himself arrested at attempting to avenge his father's death. Informing the officer who arrested him they join forces and finally bring the evil warlord to justice in an expensive fruit battle.

Cast
Chang Yi
Hon Seung Kam
Sammo Hung
Shih Chun
Wong Chung Shun
Miu Tin
Yee Yuen
Wang Lai
Lui Jun
Lee Ka Ting

External links
 
 The Fast Sword at HKcinemamagic.com

1971 films
Hong Kong action films
1971 action films
1970s Mandarin-language films
1970s Hong Kong films